Aguillane or Aquillane (possibly from Aymara  silver bowl (for a beverage), -ni a suffix, "the one with a silver bowl (or silver bowls)") is a mountain in the Andes of Peru, about  high. It is located in the Cusco Region, Espinar Province,  Condoroma District. Aguillane lies southwest of Atawallpa.

References

Mountains of Peru
Mountains of Cusco Region